Sleeping with Your Memory is a studio album by American country artist Janie Fricke. It was released in September 1981 via Columbia Records and contained 11 tracks. It was the sixth studio album of Fricke's music career and spawned two singles: "Do Me with Love" and "Don't Worry 'bout Me Baby". Both songs reached chart positions on the North American country charts. The album itself also reached charting positions in the United States.

Background and content
Janie Fricke had been signed to Columbia Records since 1977 but found it challenging to find a musical identity. This resulted in her early singles only reaching minor chart positions and receiving limited radio airplay. In the early 1980s, Fricke started focusing on ballads which ultimately led to her breakthrough with 1981's "Down to My Last Broken Heart". She would continue having a string of hits during the decade and release a series of commercially successful albums. Among these albums was Sleeping with Your Memory, which she recorded with produced Jim Ed Norman. It was Fricke's second album produced by Norman. The project was recorded in Nashville, Tennessee at Audio Media Recorders in June 1981. 

Sleeping with Your Memory was a collection of 11 tracks that contained new recordings as well as covers of previously released songs. Several ballads were featured on the collection including the title track. Among the final tracks was "Always", which was composed by Fricke's then-husband Randy Jackson. A cover version of Simon & Garfunkel's "Homeword Bound" was also included and it featured Ricky Skaggs playing fiddle. A cover version of Yvonne Elliman's "Love Me" was also part of the project.

Release, reception and singles

Sleeping with Your Memory was originally released in September 1981 on Columbia Records. It was Fricke's sixth studio release of her career. The album was originally distributed as a vinyl LP and a cassette with identical track listings. In later decades, it was reissued to digital platforms including Apple Music. The disc spent a total of 27 weeks on the American Billboard country albums survey, peaking at number 42 in March 1982. It was Fricke's second album to reach a Billboard chart. Greg Adams of AllMusic gave the album a three-star rating, calling it "an impressively consistent album that matches its hits with material nearly as good."

Sleeping with Your Memory spawned two singles that received radio airplay and reached chart positions. Its first single spawned was the track "Do Me with Love", which was released in November 1981 on Columbia Records. The single spent 19 weeks on the Billboard Hot Country Songs chart and peaked at number four in 1982. It was followed by the April 1982 release of the track "Don't Worry 'bout Me Baby". It spent 18 weeks on the Billboard country songs chart and reached the number one spot in late 1982, becoming Fricke's first number one single. In Canada, "Do Me with Love" topped the RPM country chart while "Don't Worry 'bout Me Baby" reached the top ten.

Track listings

Original versions

Digital version

Personnel
All credits are adapted from the liner notes of Sleeping with Your Memory.

Musical personnel

 Eddie Bayers – drums
 Tom Brannon – backing vocals
 Dennis Burnside – piano
 Phil Forrest – backing vocals
 Janie Fricke – lead vocals, backing vocals
 Sonny Garrish – steel guitar
 Sheri Huffman – backing vocals
 The Shelly Kurland Strings – strings

 Joe Osborn – bass
 Charlie McCoy – harmonica
 Bobby Ogdin – keyboards
 Ricky Skaggs – backing vocals, banjo, fiddle, mandolin
 Diane Tidwell – backing vocals
 Rafe Van Hoy – guitar
 Paul Worley – guitar

Technical personnel
 Dennis Burnside – keyboard arrangements
 Jim Ed Norman – producer
 Bergen White – arrangements, conductor

Charts

Release history

References

1981 albums
Albums produced by Jim Ed Norman
Columbia Records albums
Janie Fricke albums